Broadly, a synergist is an entity that displays synergy with respect to another entity.

More specifically, a synergist may be:
 a synergist muscle
 a substance that enhances the effect of another substance, such as a drug (see )
 something relating to the theological position of synergism

See also 
 Synergy (disambiguation)